The prime minister of Australia is the leader of the Government of Australia and the Cabinet of Australia, with the support of the majority of the House of Representatives. Thirty-one people have served in the position since the office was created in 1901. The role of prime minister is not mentioned in the Constitution of Australia, but the prime minister is still appointed by the governor-general who under Section 64 of the constitution has the executive power to appoint ministers of state. The governor-general is appointed by the monarch of Australia based on the advice of the incumbent prime minister. Governors-general do not have fixed terms, but usually serve for five years. 

Federal elections must be held every three years, although prime ministers may call elections early. Prime ministers do not have fixed terms, and generally serve the full length of their term unless they lose the majority of the House or are replaced as the leader of their party. Three former prime ministers lost a majority in the House (Alfred Deakin on two occasions, George Reid and Andrew Fisher), six resigned following leadership spills (John Gorton, Bob Hawke, Kevin Rudd, Julia Gillard, Tony Abbott and Malcolm Turnbull) and three died in office (Joseph Lyons, John Curtin and Harold Holt, who disappeared and is presumed to have died). Two prime ministers also lost their role in a double dissolution election, a snap election where the entire Senate stands for re-election rather than the typical half to resolve deadlocks between the two houses. These were Joseph Cook in 1914 and Malcolm Fraser in 1983. One prime minister, Gough Whitlam, was controversially dismissed by the Governor-General during a constitutional crisis.

Since the office was established in 1901, thirty men and one woman have been prime minister. Robert Menzies and Kevin Rudd served two non-consecutive terms in office whilst Alfred Deakin and Andrew Fisher served three non-consecutive terms. The 31st and current prime minister is Anthony Albanese, since 23 May 2022. There are currently seven living former prime ministers. The most recent former prime minister to die was Hawke, on 16 May 2019.

The prime ministership of Frank Forde, who was prime minister for seven days in 1945, was the shortest in Australian history. Menzies served the longest, with eighteen years over two non-consecutive periods.

List of prime ministers 
The parties shown are those to which the prime ministers belonged at the time they held office, and the electoral divisions shown are those they represented while in office. Several prime ministers belonged to parties other than those given and represented other electorates before and after their time in office.

Political parties

Status

Timeline

Career-based timeline
This timeline shows most of the early life, the political career and death of each prime minister from 1901.  The first prime minister was Edmund Barton in the early 20th century.

Key
 Each dark coloured bar denotes the time spent as prime minister
 A light colour denotes time spent in Parliament before or after serving as prime minister
 A grey colour bar denotes the time the prime minister spent outside Parliament, either before or after their political career

Notable moments
 changed party: Hughes (twice), Lyons
 died in office: Lyons, Curtin, Holt
 died shortly after leaving office: Chifley
 left Parliament on leaving office: Barton, Bruce, Menzies, Fraser, Hawke, Keating, Howard, Gillard, Turnbull
 long career after being Prime Minister: Hughes, Scullin, Page, Fadden
 was Prime Minister after an interruption to their political career: Scullin, Curtin, Chifley
 lived for more than twenty years after leaving Parliament: Watson, Cook, Bruce, Forde, Gorton, Whitlam, Fraser, Hawke, Keating
 former prime minister still living: Keating, Howard, Rudd, Gillard, Abbott, Turnbull, Morrison

Timeline

See also 

History of Australia
List of prime ministers of Australia by birthplace
List of prime ministers of Australia by time in office
Politics of Australia
Spouse of the prime minister of Australia

Notes

References

External links 
 Official website of the Prime Minister of Australia
 Museum of Australian Democracy Prime Minister Information

Lists of prime ministers of Australia